Sherrill is a city in Oneida County, New York, United States. With a population of 3,071 (2010 census), it is the state's least populous city. Sherrill is at the western end of the Town of Vernon on Route 5. Sherrill is referred to as The Silver City.

History
Sherrill was founded in 1916 through a special act of the state legislature and is named in honor of Congressman James S. Sherman's infant son Sherrill Babcock Sherman. It is unique among cities in New York, because its city charter  provides that, for many purposes, it is to be treated as if it were still a village located within the town of Vernon. While other cities in New York are not subject to a town's jurisdiction, the Vernon town government continues to have jurisdiction over the territory of the city.

In 1997, the Oneida tribe purchased land within the city, eventually initiating a dispute about whether they had to pay taxes.

Geography

New York State Route 5 passes through the north side of the city.

Demographics

As of the census of 2000, there were 3,147 people, 1,262 households, and 879 families residing in the city. The population density was 1,554.6 people per square mile (601.5/km2). There were 1,309 housing units at an average density of 646.6 per square mile (250.2/km2). The racial makeup of the city was 98.00% (3,084) White, 0.22% (6) African American, 0.60% (18) Native American, 0.60% (18) Asian, 0.03% from other races, and 0.54% from two or more races. Hispanic or Latino of any race were 0.83% (26) of the population.

There were 1,262 households, out of which 33.6% had children under the age of 18 living with them, 59.3% were married couples living together, 8.1% had a female householder with no husband present, and 30.3% were non-families. 27.4% of all households were made up of individuals, and 15.9% had someone living alone who was 65 years of age or older. The average household size was 2.48 and the average family size was 3.03.

In the city, the population was spread out, with 26.2% under the age of 18, 5.8% from 18 to 24, 25.0% from 25 to 44, 25.9% from 45 to 64, and 17.1% who were 65 years of age or older. The median age was 41 years. For every 100 females, there were 86.8 males. For every 100 females age 18 and over, there were 81.8 males.

The median income for a household in the city was $48,919, and the median income for a family was $60,573. Males had a median income of $41,179 versus $26,500 for females. The per capita income for the city was $22,311. About 0.8% of families and 2.2% of the population were below the poverty line, including 2.6% of those under age 18 and 3.9% of those age 65 or over.

With less than 3,000 estimated in 2019, Sherrill is the smallest city in New York.

Education
Vernon-Verona-Sherrill Central School District operates area schools. E.A. McAllister Elementary School is in Sherrill. The area secondary schools are Vernon-Verona-Sherrill Middle School and Vernon-Verona-Sherrill High School.

Notable people
Matt Patricia (born 1974), American football coach, former Detroit Lions head coach
Philip Markoff  (born 1986), alleged murderer, nicknamed the "Craigslist killer."
 Adam Kemp  (born 1990), professional basketball player

Notable objects
Flatware. See Sherrill Manufacturing

References

External links
 City of Sherrill, New York

Cities in New York (state)
Utica–Rome metropolitan area
Cities in Oneida County, New York
Populated places established in 1916